Alan Connelly (born October 2, 1960) is a guitarist and songwriter. He is a founding member of Glass Tiger, the Canadian rock band. He and his band received five Canadian music industry JUNO Awards and multiple Canadian songwriter SOCAN Awards, as well as being nominated Best New Artist at the 1986 GRAMMY Awards. Connelly has been part of all GT's major album releases as well as numerous  solo recordings.

Early life
Alan Connelly was born in Montreal, Quebec, Canada to Edward Connelly and Dorothy Dempsey.  He attended Huron Heights Secondary School in Newmarket, Ontario. He later earned Studio engineering diplomas both through Seneca College and Humber College in Toronto.

Career

At the age of 18, Connelly was asked to play with (future Glass Tiger bandmates) singer Alan Frew and bassist Wayne Parker in their late seventies rock band Onyx. The group disbanded after two years and Connelly formed a punk band called The Untouchable Lowlifes. They recorded some of Connelly's and singer Roland Merkle's songs.

In Toronto, Alan Frew and Wayne Parker joined forces with keyboardist Sam Reid and drummer Michael Hanson, to form the band Tokyo, which later developed into Glass Tiger. Connelly was asked to join the new band in 1983, and he performed with the band at first mainly in the Toronto area. The band signed a recording contract in 1985 with Capitol Records, resulting in Glass Tiger's debut and multi-platinum album, The Thin Red Line in 1986.

While on a writing trip to Vancouver, British Columbia, Connelly joined bandmates Sam Reid and Alan Frew to contribute to the songs "Don't Forget Me (When I'm Gone)" and "Someday". The two singles topped the American Billboard charts in 1986.

Glass Tiger received three Juno Awards that year: Album of the Year, The Thin Red Line, Single of the Year, "Don't Forget Me (When I'm Gone)", and Most Promising Group of the Year.  The band was also nominated for a Grammy Award for Best New Artist in 1987.

Connelly toured with Glass Tiger in the United States as part of the Raised on Radio Tour and on Tina Turner's European Break Every Rule Tour. Connelly recorded in Los Angeles for Glass Tiger's third album, Simple Mission, which was released by Capitol Records in 1991. The album received radio play in Europe and Canada, and the single "My Town" reached No. 1 in Germany and #33 in the UK. The album went platinum in Canada, and the single "Animal Heart" reached No. 2 on Canadian rock charts.

That year Connelly toured with Glass Tiger, first in Canada and later in Europe with the Swedish band Roxette.

In 2009 Glass Tiger, including Connelly, played to the Canadian Armed Forces stationed in Kandahar, Afghanistan, and at Camp Mirage. They went into dangerous areas at Forward Operating Bases (FOBs) to bring acoustic versions of their songs to front line soldiers.

Connelly toured across Canada in 2012 as part of Glass Tiger, along with Roxette, with whom they had toured Europe in 1992. This brought out a few new songs on the then released Greatest Hits album Then Now Next, with one new song introduced by Connelly, entitled "Stand Up (Give Yourself A Hand)".

Connelly continues to write and produce with various musicians and performers, in world music, reggae, R&B, blues, rock and pop.  He submitted and performed the song "I Am That Strong" to live audiences during the 2015 Pan Am Games in Toronto. York Region Arts & Culture picked it up and had Connelly perform it for their 2015 gala theme song.  Also in 2015 Connelly recorded with the Lipstick Junkies on their album Motown Prince.

In addition to songwriting, Connelly has spent many years being involved with behaviorally and developmentally challenged as well as autistic youth.

Awards, nominations and chart success

Juno Awards, to Glass Tiger: 
1989 Canadian Entertainer of the Year
1987 Single of the Year - "Someday" (co-writer)
1986 Album of the Year - The Thin Red Line
1986 Single of the Year - "Don't Forget Me (When I'm Gone)"
1986 Most Promising Group of the Year
Grammy Nomination, for Glass Tiger:
1987 Nomination: Best New Artist.
SOCAN awards to Glass Tiger songs:
"My Town" (co-writer)
1992 - Pop/Rock Music
2009 - SOCAN Classic
"Someday" (co-writer)
1996 - SOCAN Classic
"Animal Heart" (co-writer) 
1991 - 2nd runner-up, SOCAN Rock Song of the Year
Other success for "Someday":
1986 - Gold Single Award for 50,000 sales of the 45 RPM single in Canada
1988 - ASCAP Pop Award - Among the Most Performed Songs of the 1987 Survey Year
No 7 - Billboard Hot 100 Singles Chart / January 1987 (21 weeks on the chart)
No 11 - The Record (Canada) / November 24, 1986 (20 weeks on the chart)

Discography

Studio albums
 In Another Life (2004)

with Glass Tiger
 The Thin Red Line (1986)
 Diamond Sun (1988)
 Simple Mission (1991)
 31 (2018)

References

External links
, Al Connelly Official Site
Glass Tiger Homepage
Bio at CanadianBands.com CanConRox entry
"Glass Tiger", Canadian Pop Music Encyclopedia.
"Glass Tiger". The Canadian Encyclopedia.

1960 births
Anglophone Quebec people
Canadian people of Irish descent
Canadian rock guitarists
Canadian male guitarists
Canadian songwriters
Glass Tiger members
Living people
Musicians from Montreal
Songwriters from Quebec
Writers from Montreal
Seneca College alumni